Upelluri or Ubelluri was a primordial giant in Hurrian mythology. 

He is only known from the Song of Ullikummi, which is one of the few Hurrian texts offering a view of this culture's cosmology. It was believed that Upelluri was already alive during the separation of heaven and earth, which were placed on his back, and that he lived in the "Dark Earth," the Hurrian underworld. His name ends with the Hurrian suffix -luri, known also from the names of the mountain goddess Lelluri and Impaluri, sukkal (attendant deity) of the sea god Kiaše, as well as a number of Hurrian mountain and stone names.

In the Song of Ullikummi, known from poorly preserved fragments of a Hurrian original and a more complete Hittite translation, the eponymous monster is placed on his right shoulder by Irširra (perhaps to be identified as goddesses of nursing and midwifery), the servants of Kumarbi, to let him grow away from sight of allies of Kumarbi's enemy Teshub, such as the sun god Šimige. Later the god Ea seeks him out in order to find out how to defeat Ullikummi, and asks him if he is aware of the identity of the monster growing on his back. As it turns out, Upelluri did not notice the new burden at first, but eventually he starts to feel discomfort, something that according to this text he did not experience even during the separation of heaven and earth. The rest of the tablet is broken, and the next preserved scene does not feature Upelluri anymore. 

It has been pointed out that the later Greek Atlas plays a similar cosmological role as Upelluri.

References

Bibliography

Hurrian legendary creatures
Atlas (mythology)
Giants